Adilson Rosa Silva (born 9 September 1967) is a Brazilian boxer. He competed in the men's lightweight event at the 1992 Summer Olympics.

References

External links
 

1967 births
Living people
Brazilian male boxers
Olympic boxers of Brazil
Boxers at the 1992 Summer Olympics
Lightweight boxers